Laurel Lake Wildlife Management Area is located between Dingess and Lenore in Mingo County, West Virginia.

Hunting and fishing

Hunting opportunities include bear, deer, grouse, raccoon, squirrel, and turkey.

Fishing opportunities in the  Laurel Lake can include smallmouth bass, channel catfish, and bluegill.

Camping is not permitted in the WMA.  Camping and lodging are available at nearby Chief Logan State Park and Cabwaylingo State Forest.

Dingess Petroglyphs

The Dingess Petroglyphs serve as one of the more noteworthy attractions at Laurel Lake.

See also
Animal conservation
Fishing
Hunting
List of West Virginia wildlife management areas

References

External links
West Virginia DNR District 5 Wildlife Management Areas
West Virginia Hunting Regulations
West Virginia Fishing Regulations

Wildlife management areas of West Virginia
Protected areas of Mingo County, West Virginia
IUCN Category V